Alex Xydias (born March 22, 1922) is an American racecar driver, active in the early days of the auto racing sport involving hot rods.

Xydias was born in Los Angeles. He served in World War II as radio operator and engineer on a B-17.

In 1946, immediately after Xydias was discharged from the United States Army Air Corps, he opened the So-Cal Speed Shop in Burbank, one of the first hot rod speed shops in Southern California. In 1950, he drove the first streamliner (made from drop tanks) powered by a Flathead Ford to go over 200 mph (320 km/h). His hot rod was named the "So-cal-Streamliner" and powered by an Edelbrock V-8 60 engine. One secret to his success was a mixture of 40 percent nitromethane and not the grinding of the cam, as was commonly told.

He is a member of the board of directors of the Wally Parks NHRA Motorsports Museum.

Xydias turned 100 in March 2022.

References

1922 births
American centenarians
Living people
Racing drivers from Los Angeles
Military personnel from California
United States Army Air Forces soldiers
United States Army Air Forces personnel of World War II
Men centenarians